Habenaria delavayi is a species of plant in the family Orchidaceae. It is endemic to China.

References

Endemic orchids of China
delavayi
Vulnerable plants
Taxonomy articles created by Polbot